Sand fleabane is a common name for several plants and may refer to:

Erigeron arenarioides, endemic to Utah
Erigeron bellidiastrum, native to the western and central United States and northern Mexico